Ithile Vannavar is a 1980 Indian Malayalam-language film, directed by P. Chandrakumar and produced by M. Mani. The film stars Madhu, Sheela, MG Soman and Sukumaran. The film has musical score by Shyam.

Cast
 
Madhu as Rajan, police officer (double role)
Sheela as Devi Menon
Sukumaran as Venu
M. G. Soman as Gopinath
Ambika as Bindu
Jagathy Sreekumar as Sankarankutty /Sankari
Thikkurissy Sukumaran Nair  as Devi's father
 Mala Aravindan
Alam
Renuchandra as Raji
 N.S Vanjiyoor
T. P. Madhavan as madman
Nalini as Raji
Aryad Gopalakrishnan as Jayan
 Idavela Nanadhini
 Mini
Sheema as dancer
 Sathyasheelan
 Babu

Soundtrack
The music was composed by Shyam and the lyrics were written by Sathyan Anthikkad.

References

External links
 

1980 films
1980s Malayalam-language films
Films directed by P. Chandrakumar